In Greek mythology, Nycteus was a king of Thebes. His rule began after the death of Polydorus, and ended when he was succeeded by his brother Lycus.

Family
Nycteus and his brother Lycus were the sons of either Chthonius, one of the Spartoi, or of the nymph Clonia and Hyrieus, the son of Poseidon and the Atlantid Alkyone, or of Poseidon and the Pleiad Celaeno. Nycteus had two daughters by Polyxo, Nycteis and Antiope.

Mythology
The Nycteus and Lycus fled from Euboea after they murdered King Phlegyas, settling in Hyria and then moving to Thebes, because they were friends with Pentheus, its king. Nycteus's daughter, Nycteis married Polydorus, who was the successor of Pentheus, and their son was Labdacus. However, Pentheus and Polydorus both died soon after, and Nycteus became regent for Labdacus.

After Antiope was impregnated by Zeus and fled to marry king Epopeus in Sicyon, the Bibliotheca reports that Nycteus killed himself in shame, after asking Lycus to punish her. Pausanias, however, states that Nycteus led the Thebans against Epopeus, but was wounded and carried back to Thebes, where he died after asking Lycus to continue the battle. Lycus succeeded him as regent of Thebes.

Theban royal family tree

Notes

References 

 Apollodorus, The Library with an English Translation by Sir James George Frazer, F.B.A., F.R.S. in 2 Volumes, Cambridge, MA, Harvard University Press; London, William Heinemann Ltd. 1921. ISBN 0-674-99135-4. Online version at the Perseus Digital Library. Greek text available from the same website.
 Pausanias, Description of Greece with an English Translation by W.H.S. Jones, Litt.D., and H.A. Ormerod, M.A., in 4 Volumes. Cambridge, MA, Harvard University Press; London, William Heinemann Ltd. 1918. . Online version at the Perseus Digital Library
 Pausanias, Graeciae Descriptio. 3 vols. Leipzig, Teubner. 1903.  Greek text available at the Perseus Digital Library.

Theban kings
Kings in Greek mythology
Boeotian characters in Greek mythology
Theban characters in Greek mythology
Boeotian mythology
Theban mythology